St. Catherine International Airport  is an airport serving St. Catherine (or St. Katherine), Saint Katherine city in the South Sinai Governorate of Egypt. It is located about 20 km (12 mi.) northeast of the city, which is near Mount Sinai.

Airlines and destinations 
There are currently no scheduled services to and from the airport. In 2011, the airport served 247 passengers (-72.6% vs. 2010).

References

External links
 
 

Airports in Egypt